Korazim is a community settlement in northern Israel. Located on the Korazim plateau to the north of the Sea of Galilee, it falls under the jurisdiction of Mevo'ot HaHermon Regional Council.

History
The village was founded in 1983 as a moshav, but after it merged with Ma'of it became a community settlement. It is found just north of the Sea of Galilee. It is named after ancient Chorazin, mentioned in the New Testament, now the site of a much-visited archaeological park, which is located about 1 km east of the modern village.

It was founded on the land of the depopulated Palestinian village of Al-Samakiyya.

See also
Khirbat Karraza or Chorazin, the ruins of the nearby ancient village, now a national park

References

External links
Village website 
Talmud-era winepress, mosaic unearthed in Jewish village condemned by Jesus

Populated places in Northern District (Israel)
Community settlements
Populated places established in 1983
1983 establishments in Israel
Hitahdut HaIkarim
Upper Galilee